Statistics of Primera Fuerza in season 1940-41.

Overview
It was contested by 8 teams, and Atlante won the championship.

League standings

Table takes award of 3 matches against Asturias into account.

Top goalscorers
Players sorted first by goals scored, then by last name.

References
Mexico - List of final tables (RSSSF)

1940-41
1940–41 in Mexican football
Mex